Hang Tau Tsuen or Hang Tau Village, is the name of several villages in Hong Kong:

 Hang Tau Tsuen, North District, in Kwu Tung, Sheung Shui, North District
 Hang Tau Tsuen, Yuen Long District, in Ping Shan, Yuen Long District